Anthems For Worship is a compilation release from Christian band Phatfish, released early by the band in December 2010 and officially released by Kingsway Music in February 2011. It features 14 of the band's congregational worship songs written over the years, many that are popular with Churches globally, and a few from recent Phatfish albums.

Most of the songs are drawn from the band's four previous studio releases; Nothing But The Truth (2003), Faithful (2004), Guaranteed (2007) and In Jesus (2009), with the rest being new or re-released. All the tracks are remastered with certain elements sounding slightly different such as Lou Fellingham's vocals brought more upfront on all the songs taken from Faithful.

Additionally, three of the tracks from the album Faithful, "Come Let Us Worship", "Awake Awake O Zion" and "Here Is The Risen Son", have been remixed with additional instruments added. Two of the songs are previously unreleased live recordings, these are "Holy Holy (Lift Up His Name)" and "Amazing God", whilst "O God Of Love" and "Here Is Love" are brand new recordings for the album. Finally, "There Is A Day" is the 2006 DVD version of the song that was also released on Phatfish's 2008 anniversary album 15.

The album was released in limited edition quantities by the band in December 2010 with the official release of the album under their new label Kingsway Music in February 2011.

Track listing

 "Come Let Us Worship"
 "There Is A Day"
 "Amazing God"
 "Pardoned"
 "Holy Holy"
 "Awake Awake O Zion"
 "O God Of Love"
 "Faithful"
 "The Cross"
 "Here Is Love"
 "To You King Jesus"
 "Here Is The Risen Son"
 "Pouring Out"
 "Holy Spirit"

Personnel

Phatfish
Lou Fellingham – vocals
Nathan Fellingham – drums, production, backing vocals
Luke Fellingham – bass guitar, engineering
Michael Sandeman – keyboards
Jos Wintermeyer – guitars
Ben Hall – guitars
Alan Rose – guitars

Additional personnel
Julian Kindred – engineering, production
Kevan Frost – engineering, production, additional percussion
David Kindred – guitars, electric keyboards

2010 compilation albums
2011 compilation albums
Phatfish albums